The 1904 Nebraska Cornhuskers football team represented the University of Nebraska as an independent during the 1904 college football season. The team played home games at Antelope Field in Lincoln, Nebraska

Nebraska entered 1904 on a 24-game winning streak, a stretch that included undefeated seasons in 1902 and 1903. The Cornhuskers extended the winning streak to 27 games before losing to Colorado on October 8.

Schedule

Coaching staff

Roster

Game summaries

Grand Island

Despite playing its starters only in the second half, Nebraska beat Grand Island 72–0 in the second-largest victory in school history.

Lincoln High

Nebraska shut out Lincoln High in a pre-season exhibition game.

Grinnell

On a rainy, muddy day in Lincoln, Nebraska registered its fifth consecutive shutout victory.

at Colorado

Colorado became the first team to shut out Nebraska in four years, ending the Cornhuskers' winning streak at 27 games. NU had three opportunities inside of CU's 10-yard line, but failed to score on any of them, and Colorado defeated Nebraska for the first time.

at Creighton

Lincoln Medics

Nebraska defeated the Lincoln Medics 29–0 in an exhibition game that was the only meeting between the schools.

Knox

Despite just one day off since scrimmaging the Lincoln Medics, NU shut out Knox 34–0.

at Minnesota

After a one-year break, NU's series with Minnesota resumed in Minneapolis. The Gophers scored first, but Nebraska tied the game shortly afterward, the first time a team scored against Minnesota in 12 games. A late Minnesota touchdown gave the Gophers a 16–12 victory.

Iowa

Haskell

Nebraska's only points in an upset loss came after recovering a Haskell fumble in the end zone.

Bellevue

Illinois

NU faced Illinois to end the season for the second consecutive year. Illinois took an early lead and never let Nebraska take control of the game, but the Cornhuskers held on to win 16–10.

References

Nebraska
Nebraska Cornhuskers football seasons
Nebraska Cornhuskers football